This article is a non-exhaustive list of the château, located in the French department of Cher in the Centre-Val de Loire region.

There are more than 400 extant châteaux and manors in Cher, not counting hôtels particuliers. The communes with the most châteaux are Presly (11), Bourges (8), Nançay (8), Brinon-sur-Sauldre (7) and Saint-Éloy-de-Gy (6). The most famous are the Château de Meillant, the Château d'Ainay-le-Vieil, the Château de la Verrerie and the Château de Culan.

List of châteaux

See also
 List of châteaux in Centre-Val de Loire
 List of châteaux in France
 List of castles in France

References

External links
American Commission for Protection and Salvage of Artistic and Historic Monuments in War Areas (1946)

Cher